The 1992 Pepperdine Waves baseball team represented Pepperdine University in the 1992 NCAA Division I baseball season. The Waves played their home games at Eddy D. Field Stadium. The team was coached by Andy Lopez in his 4th season at Pepperdine.

The Waves won the College World Series, defeating the Cal State Fullerton Titans in the championship game.

Roster

Schedule 

! style="background:#002663;color:white;"| Regular Season
|-

|- align="center" bgcolor="ddffdd"
|  || Eddy D. Field Stadium || 8-5 || 1–0 || –
|- align="center" bgcolor="ddffdd"
|  || Eddy D. Field Stadium || 5-3 || 2–0 || –
|- align="center" bgcolor="ddffdd"
| at Southern California || Dedeaux Field || 10-9 || 3–0 || –
|- align="center" bgcolor="ddffdd"
|  || Eddy D. Field Stadium || 8-6 || 4–0 || –
|- align="center" bgcolor="ddffdd"
|  || Eddy D. Field Stadium || 5-2 || 5–0 || –
|- align="center" bgcolor="ffdddd"
| at  || Sunken Diamond || 1-7 || 5–1 || –
|- align="center" bgcolor="ffdddd"
| at Stanford || Sunken Diamond || 3-4 || 5–2 || –
|- align="center" bgcolor="ffdddd"
| at Stanford || Sunken Diamond || 3-4 || 5–3 || –
|- align="center" bgcolor="ddffdd"
|  || Eddy D. Field Stadium || 7-6 || 6–3 || –
|- align="center" bgcolor="ddffdd"
|  || Eddy D. Field Stadium || 19-8 || 7–3 || –
|- align="center" bgcolor="ddffdd"
| Northwestern || Eddy D. Field Stadium || 8-2 || 8–3 || –
|- align="center" bgcolor="ffdddd"
| at  || Blair Field || 5-6 || 8–4 || –
|- align="center" bgcolor="ddffdd"
| at  || Benedetti Diamond || 14-0 || 9–4 || 1–0
|- align="center" bgcolor="ddffdd"
| at San Francisco || Benedetti Diamond || 3-2 || 10–4 || 2–0
|- align="center" bgcolor="ffdddd"
| at San Francisco || Benedetti Diamond || 5-11 || 10–5 || 2–1
|- align="center" bgcolor="ddffdd"
|  || Eddy D. Field Stadium || 1-0 || 11–5 || 3–1
|- align="center" bgcolor="ddffdd"
| Santa Clara || Eddy D. Field Stadium || 13-0 || 12–5 || 4–1
|- align="center" bgcolor="ffdddd"
| at  || Jackie Robinson Stadium || 1-0 || 12–6 || –
|- align="center" bgcolor="ddffdd"
| at  || George C. Page Stadium || 17-4 || 13–6 || 5–1
|- align="center" bgcolor="ddffdd"
| at Loyola Marymount || George C. Page Stadium || 7-1 || 14–6 || 6–1
|- align="center" bgcolor="ddffdd"
| at Loyola Marymount || George C. Page Stadium || 6-2 || 15–6 || 7–1
|- align="center" bgcolor="ddddff"
| Long Beach State || Eddy D. Field Stadium || 4-4 || 15–6–1 || –
|- align="center" bgcolor="ddffdd"
|  || Eddy D. Field Stadium || 5-0 || 16–6–1 || –
|- align="center" bgcolor="ddffdd"
| Hartford || Eddy D. Field Stadium || 11-10 || 17–6–1 || –
|- align="center" bgcolor="ddffdd"
| at  || Louis Guisto Field || 13-1 || 18–6–1 || 8–1
|- align="center" bgcolor="ffdddd"
| at Saint Mary's || Louis Guisto Field || 2-4 || 18–7–1 || 8–2
|- align="center" bgcolor="ffdddd"
| at Saint Mary's || Louis Guisto Field || 4-6 || 18–8–1 || 8–3
|- align="center" bgcolor="ddffdd"
| Stanford || Eddy D. Field Stadium || 5-4 || 19–8–1 || –
|- align="center" bgcolor="ddffdd"
|  || Eddy D. Field Stadium || 2-0 || 20–8–1 || 9–3
|- align="center" bgcolor="ddffdd"
| San Diego || Eddy D. Field Stadium || 5-0 || 21–8–1 || 10–3
|- align="center" bgcolor="ffdddd"
| San Diego || Eddy D. Field Stadium || 2-4 || 21–9–1 || 10–4
|- align="center" bgcolor="ddffdd"
| at San Diego || John Cunningham Stadium || 3-1 || 22–9–1 || 11–4
|- align="center" bgcolor="ddffdd"
| at San Diego || John Cunningham Stadium || 6-1 || 23–9–1 || 12–4
|- align="center" bgcolor="ddffdd"
| at San Diego || John Cunningham Stadium || 2-1 || 24–9–1 || 13–4
|- align="center" bgcolor="ddffdd"
|  || Eddy D. Field Stadium || 10-6 || 25–9–1 || –
|- align="center" bgcolor="ddffdd"
| San Francisco || Eddy D. Field Stadium || 14-0 || 26–9–1 || 14–4
|- align="center" bgcolor="ddffdd"
| San Francisco || Eddy D. Field Stadium || 5-2 || 27–9–1 || 15–4
|- align="center" bgcolor="ddffdd"
| San Francisco || Eddy D. Field Stadium || 6-1 || 28–9–1 || 16–4
|- align="center" bgcolor="ffdddd"
| at UC Santa Barbara || Caesar Uyesaka Stadium || 7-9 || 28–10–1 || –
|- align="center" bgcolor="ddffdd"
| at Chapman || W.O. Park || 5-2 || 29–10–1 || –
|- align="center" bgcolor="ddffdd"
| at Santa Clara || Buck Shaw Stadium || 9-8 || 30–10–1 || 17–4
|- align="center" bgcolor="ddffdd"
| at Santa Clara || Buck Shaw Stadium || 8-7 || 31–10–1 || 18–4
|- align="center" bgcolor="ddffdd"
| at Santa Clara || Buck Shaw Stadium || 16-0 || 32–10–1 || 19–4
|- align="center" bgcolor="ddffdd"
| at Santa Clara || Buck Shaw Stadium || 10-1 || 33–10–1 || 20–4
|- align="center" bgcolor="ddffdd"
|  || Anteater Field || 4-3 || 34–10–1 || –
|- align="center" bgcolor="ddffdd"
|  || Eddy D. Field Stadium || 11-2 || 35–10–1 || –
|- align="center" bgcolor="ddffdd"
| Loyola Marymount || Eddy D. Field Stadium || 6-1 || 36–10–1 || 21–4
|- align="center" bgcolor="ddffdd"
| Loyola Marymount || Eddy D. Field Stadium || 3-2 || 37–10–1 || 22–4
|- align="center" bgcolor="ddffdd"
| Loyola Marymount || Eddy D. Field Stadium || 17-2 || 38–10–1 || 23–4
|- align="center" bgcolor="ddffdd"
| at Cal State Northridge || Matador Field || 6-4 || 39–10–1 || –
|- align="center" bgcolor="ddffdd"
| UCLA || Eddy D. Field Stadium || 16-8 || 40–10–1 || –
|-

|-
! style="background:#002663;color:white;"| Post-season
|-

|- align="center" bgcolor="ddffdd"
| vs.  || Sancet Stadium || 5–4 || 41–10–1
|- align="center" bgcolor="ddffdd"
| vs.  || Sancet Stadium || 8–5 || 42–10–1
|- align="center" bgcolor="ddffdd"
| vs.  || Sancet Stadium || 11–0 || 43–10–1
|- align="center" bgcolor="ffdddd"
| vs.  || Sancet Stadium || 3–6 || 43–11–1
|- align="center" bgcolor="ddffdd"
| vs. Hawaii || Sancet Stadium || 9–0 || 44–11–1
|-

|- align="center" bgcolor="ddffdd"
| May 30 || vs.  || Rosenblatt Stadium || 6–0 || 45–11–1
|- align="center" bgcolor="ddffdd"
| June 1 || vs. Texas || Rosenblatt Stadium || 7–0 || 46–11–1
|- align="center" bgcolor="ddffdd"
| June 4 || vs. Texas || Rosenblatt Stadium || 5–4 || 47–11–1
|- align="center" bgcolor="ddffdd"
| June 6 || vs. Cal State Fullerton || Rosenblatt Stadium || 3–2 || 48–11–1
|-

Awards and honors 
Pat Ahearne
 College World Series All-Tournament Team
 All-America First Team
 WCC Pitcher of the Year
 All-WCC First Team

Steve Duda
 All-WCC First Team

David Main
 All-WCC First Team

Dan Melendez
 College World Series All-Tournament Team
 All-America Second Team
 All-WCC First Team

Steve Montgomery
 All-America Second Team
 All-WCC First Team

Steve Rodriguez
 College World Series All-Tournament Team
 All-America Third Team
 WCC Player of the Year
 All-WCC First Team

Chris Sheff
 All-WCC First Team

Scott Vollmer
 College World Series All-Tournament Team
 All-WCC First Team

Waves in the 1992 MLB Draft 
The following members of the Pepperdine Waves baseball program were drafted in the 1992 Major League Baseball Draft.

References 

Pepperdine
Pepperdine Waves baseball seasons
College World Series seasons
NCAA Division I Baseball Championship seasons
West Coast Conference baseball champion seasons
1992 in sports in California
Pepperdine